Hanthana Dewage Rashmi Sewandi Silva (born 4 December 2000, known as Rashmi Silva) is a Sri Lankan cricketer who currently plays for Sri Lanka Navy Sports Club and Sri Lanka.

International career
In June 2022, Silva named in Sri Lanka's Women's One Day International squad for the series against India. She made her WODI debut on 1 July 2022 against India.

In July 2022, she was named in Sri Lanka's team for the cricket tournament at the 2022 Commonwealth Games in Birmingham, England.

References

External links
 
 

2000 births
Living people
Cricketers from Colombo
Sri Lankan women cricketers
Sri Lanka women One Day International cricketers
Cricketers at the 2022 Commonwealth Games
Commonwealth Games competitors for Sri Lanka